World Music is the debut album by Swedish alternative band Goat that was released on 20 August 2012 on Stranded Rekords (Sweden) and Rocket Recordings (UK). It was hailed as one of the best albums of 2012 by The Guardian newspaper.

The album entered the Swedish Albums Chart at number 8 on week ending 19 October 2012.

Track listing
"Diarabi" (2:56)
"Goatman" (4:15)
"Goathead" (5:40)
"Disco Fever" (4:24)
"Golden Dawn" (2:50)
"Let It Bleed" (3:54)
"Run to Your Mama" (2:22)
"Goatlord" (3:04)
"Det som aldrig förändras / Diarabi" (7:44)

Charts

References

2012 debut albums
Goat (band) albums